USS Bittern (AM-36) was a  in the United States Navy. She was named after the bittern, a bird of the heron family. The vessel was constructed by Alabama Dry Dock and Shipbuilding Co., in Mobile, Alabama, and launched on 15 February 1919 and commissioned on 28 May later that year. Initially operating in U.S. coastal waters, the vessel was reassigned to western Pacific operations in 1920, based in the Philippine Islands. Shortly after the U.S. entry into World War II, Bittern was scuttled to avoid capture after being severely damaged during a Japanese air raid on Cavite Navy Yard in December 1941.

Construction and career
Bittern was launched 15 February 1919 by Alabama Dry Dock and Shipbuilding Co., Mobile, Alabama; sponsored by Mrs. C. R. Doll; and commissioned 28 May 1919.  Bitterns first duty was as tender to the captured German submarine  while she made an exhibition tour of the U.S. Gulf Coast and U.S. West Coast ports.

In January 1920 Bittern sailed for the Far East where she remained for the rest of her active service. Throughout most of the next 21 years she wintered at Cavite, Philippine Islands, and summered at Chefoo, China. But the routine was broken occasionally by assignment to scientific expeditions and in September 1923 by relief work following the Yokohama, Japan, earthquake.

Fate 
The Japanese air raid on Cavite Navy Yard on 10 December 1941 found Bittern undergoing repairs. Although not hit, Bittern suffered extensive damage from fire, near misses, and flying debris from  moored alongside.

References

External links 
 uboat.net - USS Bittern
 America at War 
 Roll of Honor

Lapwing-class minesweepers
Ships built in Mobile, Alabama
1919 ships
World War II shipwrecks in the Philippine Sea
World War II minesweepers of the United States
Maritime incidents in December 1941
Scuttled vessels